Tekezé Dam is a double-curvature arch dam located between Amhara and Tigray region of Ethiopia. It is situated on the Tekezé River, a tributary of the Nile that flows through one of the deepest canyons in the world.

Overview
CWGS was contracted to build the Tekezé Dam. The hydroelectric project was completed in February 2009. Its final cost was $360 million, which was $136 million over budget. The dam was Ethiopia's largest public works project. The dam helped to reduce power shortages as Ethiopia's power demand increases.

At the time of its completion, the  Tekezé Dam was Africa's largest double-curvature arch dam. The resulting reservoir is 105 km2 large and it has a capacity of 9.3 billion m³ of water.

Tekeze Power Station
The powerhouse contains four  turbines, generating  of electricity. A  transmission line connects it to the national grid at Mekelle.

See also

 Energy in Ethiopia
 List of power stations in Ethiopia
 Water politics in the Nile Basin

References

Dams completed in 2009
Dams in Ethiopia
Dams in the Nile basin
Reservoirs in Ethiopia
Tigray Region
Atbarah River
21st-century architecture in Ethiopia